The 1840 United States presidential election in Connecticut took place between October 30 and December 2, 1840, as part of the 1840 United States presidential election. Voters chose eight representatives, or electors to the Electoral College, who voted for President and Vice President.

Connecticut voted for the Whig candidate, William Henry Harrison, over Democratic candidate Martin Van Buren. Harrison won Connecticut by a margin of 11.1%.

Results

See also
 United States presidential elections in Connecticut

References

Connecticut
1840
1840 Connecticut elections